Świnoujście Lighthouse is an active lighthouse in Świnoujście, Poland. At a height of  it is the fifteenth tallest "traditional lighthouse" in the world, as well as the tallest brick lighthouse, and the tallest in Poland. It is located on the east bank of the river Świna just inside the entrance.

History 

The first lighthouse in the location was built in 1828 when the town was part of the Kingdom of Prussia and called Swinemünde. The current structure is from 1857. The cross-section of the entire 1857 tower was octagonal. However, in 1902–1903 the tower was restored to repair spalled brickwork. This converted the shape of the tower above the first gallery to the current round shape.

The tower was damaged during World War II. In 1945, during the retreat of the German troops, an order was given to destroy the lighthouse. However, the German keeper refused the order and the tower survived. The damage was only repaired in 1959, some fourteen years after the town was annexed by Poland.

In 1998–2000, for the new Millennium, the lighthouse was restored. It was reopened to the public in August 2000, along with a lighthouse museum in the keeper's house.

Construction 
The tower is built of yellow bricks and is unpainted. The base of the tower is octagonal with a gallery. The tower itself is round with a second gallery and a lantern. Adjacent to the tower is a 2-story brick keeper's house and a museum.

There are 300 steps up to the second gallery.

Visiting 
The museum and tower are open Monday through Friday.

See also 

 List of lighthouses in Poland
 List of tallest lighthouses in the world

References 

  Listed as "Pilot Tower"

External links 

 The Lighthouses of Poland
 Urząd Morski w Słupsku  
 Świnoujście Lighthouse - Latarnia morska (Świnoujście) na portalu polska-org.pl 

Lighthouses completed in 1828
Lighthouses completed in 1857
Lighthouses in Poland
Lighthouse
Museums in West Pomeranian Voivodeship
Lighthouse museums
1828 establishments in Prussia
Buildings and structures in West Pomeranian Voivodeship